Rivers State University (RIVSU or RSU), formerly Rivers State University of Science and Technology (UST or RSUST), is a university located in the Diobu (Mile III) area of Port Harcourt, Rivers State, Nigeria.

As of 2021, the vice chancellor of the university is Professor Nlerum Sunday Okogbule.

History
The Rivers State University of Science and Technology was established in 1972 as the College of Science and Technology. It was granted independent university status in 1980 and was renamed from College of Science and Technology to Rivers State University of Science and Technology. In March 2017, the university was renamed to Rivers State University. It is the only university in Nigeria that is accredited to offer degree programs in Marine Engineering.

Faculties and courses

Faculty of Sciences
Department of Chemistry
Department of Biochemistry
Department of Physics
Department of Mathematics
Department of Computer Science
Department of Biochemistry 
Department of Animal and Environmental Biology
Department of Microbiology
Department of Plant Science and Biotechnology
Department of Medical Laboratory Science
Department of Geology
Department of Maritime Science

Faculty of Engineering
Department of Civil
Highway Engineering
Structural Engineering
Hydraulics
Department of Marine Engineering
Department of Petroleum Engineering
Department of Mechanical Engineering
Department of Electrical Engineering
Department of Chemical/petrochemical Engineering
Department of Agricultural And Environmental Engineering

Faculty of Law
Department of Business Law
Department of International Law
Department of Public Law
 Department of Private and Property Law
 Department of Independent Law and Crime Law

Faculty of Management Sciences
Department of Office And Information Management
Department of Marketing
Department of Management
Department of Banking And Finance
Department of Accountancy

Faculty of Environmental Sciences
Department of Surveying And Geomatics
Department of Estate Management
Department of Quantity Surveying
Department of Architecture
Department of Urban And Regional Planning

Faculty of Agriculture
Department of Forestry and Environment
Department of Agric and Applied Economics
Department of Agric Extension and Rural Development
Department of Animal Science 
Department of Crop/Soil Science
Department of Fisheries and Aquatic Environment 
Department of Food Science and Technology
Department of Home Science and Management

Faculty of Education
Department of Adult Education
Department of Vocational and Technical Education
Department of Education Management
Department of Education Foundation
Department of Business Education
Department of Science Education
Department of Library and Information Science

Faculty of Humanities 
Department of English and Literature
Department of History and International Relations
Department of Theatre Arts
Department of Philosophy
Department of Religious Studies

College of Social Sciences 
Department of Mass Communication
Department of Political Science
Department of Psychology
Department of Geography
Department of Economics

College of Medical Sciences 
Faculty of Basic medical sciences
Faculty of Clinical sciences
Nursing

Notable alumni

 Magnus Abe, Senator of the Federal Republic of Nigeria
 Judith Amaechi, former First Lady of Rivers State
 Tonto Dikeh, Actress
 Mujahid Dokubo-Asari, Ijaw activist (left before graduation)
 Manuela George-Izunwa, Politician
 Austin Opara, former Deputy Speaker, House of Representatives of Nigeria
 Goodluck Nanah Opiah, Politician
 Felicity Okpete Ovai, Engineer
 Mary Uranta, Actress, Producer, Singer
 Eberechi Wike, Judge of the Rivers State High Court of Justice
 Nyesom Ezenwo Wike, current Governor of Rivers State

Notes

External links
Rivers State university of Science and Technology
Rivers State university of Science and Technology

 
1980 establishments in Nigeria
1980s establishments in Rivers State
Educational institutions established in 1980
Science schools in Rivers State
Public universities in Nigeria
Technological universities in Nigeria
Universities and colleges in Port Harcourt